Derek James Fowlds (2 September 1937 – 17 January 2020) was an English actor. He was best known for his appearances as "Mr Derek" in The Basil Brush Show (1969–1973), Bernard Woolley in the sitcom Yes Minister (1980–1984) and its sequel Yes, Prime Minister (1986–1988), and as Oscar Blaketon in Heartbeat (1992–2010).

Early life
Fowlds was born on 2 September 1937 in Wandsworth, London, the son of Ketha Muriel (née Treacher) and James Witney Fowlds, a salesman. In early life he and his mother and sister went to live in Berkhamsted in Hertfordshire, at the home of his maternal grandmother. There Fowlds attended Ashlyns School, a former Secondary Modern School. After leaving school aged 15, Fowlds worked at a printer's firm as an apprentice and also, as his National Service, spent two years in the RAF as a wireless operator.

Career
After success in amateur acting, his teacher encouraged him to take it up as a career and Fowlds won a scholarship to RADA in 1958. 

He made his debut on the West End stage in The Miracle Worker. He appeared in various film roles, including Tamahine (1963), East of Sudan (1964), Hotel Paradiso (1966), Frankenstein Created Woman (1967), The Smashing Bird I Used to Know (1969), Tower of Evil (1972) and Mistress Pamela (1974), prior to becoming familiar to British television child viewers as "Mr. Derek" in the popular British children's series The Basil Brush Show for four series, replacing Rodney Bewes as presenter.

He played the role of Lord Randolph Churchill in the ATV series Edward the Seventh (1975). In Yes Minister and its sequel Yes, Prime Minister he played the naïve and callow Bernard Woolley alongside Paul Eddington's Jim Hacker and Nigel Hawthorne's Sir Humphrey Appleby.

From 1983 to 1985, Fowlds played the lead role in the sitcom Affairs of the Heart. He featured in a more sinister role in the 1990 political thriller Die Kinder. Fowlds then played old and curmudgeonly Oscar Blaketon in the long-running Yorkshire Television police drama nostalgia series Heartbeat set in the sixties for its entire eighteen-year run beginning in 1992. The character first appeared as the local police sergeant, then retired from the force and ran the post office before becoming a publican.

Personal life and death
Fowlds married, and later divorced, Wendy Tory, and later wed and divorced (in 1978) the Blue Peter presenter and dancer Lesley Judd. His partner of 36 years, Jo Lindsay, died in 2012. He was the father of two sons, including the actor Jeremy Fowlds. His autobiography, A Part Worth Playing, was published in 2015.

He died at Royal United Hospital in Bath on 17 January 2020 at age 82 from complications of heart failure and sepsis, which had followed pneumonia. His funeral was held at St Katharine's Church in Holt, Wiltshire on 17 February 2020.

Filmography

References

External links

 Derek Fowlds at the British Film Institute
 
 Derek Fowlds as Oscar Blaketon in 'Heartbeat' 

1937 births
2020 deaths
20th-century English male actors
21st-century English male actors
20th-century Royal Air Force personnel
Alumni of RADA
British male comedy actors
Deaths from sepsis
English male film actors
English male stage actors
English male television actors
Infectious disease deaths in England
Male actors from London
People from Balham